Grid (stylised as GRID) is a 2019 racing video game developed and published by Codemasters for Microsoft Windows, PlayStation 4, and Xbox One in October 2019, and for Stadia and Amazon Luna in November 2019 and October 2020 as a launch title for each system, respectively. It is the fourth title in the Grid series. A sequel, Grid Legends, was released on February 25, 2022.

Gameplay
Grid emphasises the concept of racing disciplines, making them into the new event categories. There are six main categories: Touring, Stock, Tuner, GT, FA Racing and invitational. During Career mode, the player picks a particular event in one of these categories, with each event (a string of races) making up a championship. Each discipline features markedly different cars and race types. The latter include standard Races, Time Attack events, Time Trials, and point-to-point Sprint races. These features included the in-game commentary from Alex from the United States as a play-by-play, along with former 2-time World Time Attack Champion and a regular top level touring car driver from Australia, named Kristen as an analyst during the race.

Grid World Series
The Grid World Series is a highly competitive racing event that races on various tracks on various continents around the globe. It features race types including Race and Time Attack. Winning races against drivers in established teams in the entire disciplines gains more money for the series, and the achievement of which earns extra experience points (XP) for the players besides those received for their results. Once completed, the player is welcomed to the Grid World Series, and must either complete the main objective when the players entered an event, or earn a gold, silver or bronze medal to earn money, and unlock player's teammates, banner and panel images, as well as custom liveries and accolades.

Nemesis System 
One of the key mechanics is the Nemesis System where AI drivers will become aggressive towards the player if they hit them too hard or too often, as part of this there are 400 unique AI drivers, each with their own racing style. Fernando Alonso appears in this game as a "Racing Consultant", with the player facing him in the single-player campaign's final event, as well as a spotter.

Cars
The cars in the disciplines of the game are further divided into tiers and classes of various strength. Some of the highlights of the vehicles on offer are the contemporary TCR (TC-2), Supercars (Super Tourers) and Group 5 cars (TC-1 Specials) of the Touring discipline, as well as the American modified muscle cars, fictional Dumont Type 37 and a customized Oval Stock Jupiter San Marino representing the Stock discipline, the GT4, GTE and DPi cars of the GT discipline, JDM modified tuning and World Time Attack cars representing the Tuner discipline, and the classic cars from the 1960s until 2000s representing the Invitational discipline. This is the first in the series not to feature Mercedes-Benz & McLaren cars, except the McLaren M8D.

Tracks
In the case of the tracks, the main emphasis is on real-world permanent circuits which make up the majority of the courses in the game. These range from classics, such as Brands Hatch, Silverstone, Indianapolis, to more modern facilities, like the Sydney Motorsport Park, Sepang and Zhejiang International Circuit. City locations with fictionally lined, but mostly real-world streets of San Francisco, Shanghai, Barcelona, Havana, and the fictional point-to-point tracks in authentic settings complete the picture (Okutama only), and — as DLCs — including the Red Bull Ring, Paris and Suzuka International Racing Course.

Development

GRID was originally announced on 21 May 2019. It was initially scheduled for release on 13 September 2019, but it was decided by the creators to delay the game's original release date to give it “added exposure” for when it released. The game was later released on 11 October 2019. Versions for cloud-based streaming services Google Stadia and Amazon Luna were released on 19 November 2019 and 20 October 2020, respectively.

The sound design team recorded over 69 cars for the game, capturing intake, exhaust, transmission, and cabin sounds to properly characterize each car.

Reception

Grid received "mixed or average" and "generally favorable" reviews, according to review aggregator Metacritic.

Awards

References

External links
 

2019 video games
Codemasters games
Ego (game engine) games
Grid (series)
Multiplayer and single-player video games
PlayStation 4 games
Racing video games
Sports video games with career mode
Stadia games
Video games set in Australia
Video games set in Austria
Video games set in Shanghai
Video games set in China
Video games set in Japan
Video games set in Malaysia
Video games set in Paris
Video games set in Spain
Video games set in England
Video games set in Cuba
Video games set in San Francisco
Video games set in Indianapolis
Windows games
Xbox One games
Video games developed in the United Kingdom